Ashley Martin Greenwood OBE MC QC (12 June 1912 – 30 September 2003) was a British soldier, lawyer, and judge. He served inter alia as Attorney General of Fiji and Attorney General of Gibraltar, as well as a judge in Uganda. He was also an accomplished mountaineer. He calculated that in his climbing, military and legal careers, he had spent time in 103 countries.

Education 
Educated initially at Haileybury College, Greenwood enrolled at Clare College, Cambridge, where he took a double first in Classics and graduated in Law.

In his student days, Greenwood developed a lifelong passion for mountaineering, scaling numerous peaks in the Alps, Dolomites, Tyrol, and Norway, as well as mountains closer to home in Scotland and Wales. He was elected to the Alpine Club at the age of 24. His mountaineering expertise proved crucial during his military service in the Second World War. He went on to marry a fellow-mountaineer. He celebrated his 80th birthday by scaling the 6121-meter high Stok Kangri Himalayan peak in Ladakh.

Military service 
Greenwood joined the Royal Artillery as a temporary Captain in 1940, with service number 132776. In April 1943, at a mountain warfare conference at Lochailort, Scotland, he was transferred to the New Zealand Squadron as a climbing instructor for mountain warfare. He accompanied the New Zealand Squadron in its ultimately doomed attempt to occupy the Italian-controlled Dodecanese Islands. Escaping to Turkey, he went on to become a liaison officer for the Long Range Desert Group of a British brigade in Montenegro in 1945. In June 1945, he joined the Allied Military Government Organization in Austria, serving until March 1946. Shortly afterwards, he joined the Colonial Office. He was awarded the Military Cross in 1944.

Legal career 
Greenwood was appointed Deputy Registrar of the High Court of Uganda in 1946, becoming Registrar in 1947 and Resident Magistrate in 1950.

Called to the bar at London's Inner Temple in 1952, Greenwood became a Crown Counsel in 1954. After serving briefly as Solicitor General of Fiji in 1956, he became Attorney General later that year, serving until 1963, when he became Attorney General of Gibraltar. He later filled in as Acting Attorney General of Montserrat, as well as a legal adviser in Hong Kong. He was also to spend a year in Washington, D.C. as an adviser to the Telstar Conference.

Personal life 
Greenwood married fellow-mountaineer Rosemary Farmborough Howard in 1956. They had first climbed together before the war. Up until 1978, they together climbed mountains in New Zealand, Austria, Italy, Greece, Nepal, India and Peru. They both belonged to the Eagle Ski Club.

References

Attorneys General of the Colony of Fiji
Attorneys-general of Fiji
Attorneys-General of Gibraltar
Attorneys general of Montserrat
Solicitors-General of Fiji
Colony of Fiji people
British colonial officials
Uganda Protectorate judges
Royal Artillery officers
British mountain climbers
People educated at Haileybury and Imperial Service College
Alumni of Clare College, Cambridge
British expatriates in Fiji
1912 births
2003 deaths
Officers of the Order of the British Empire
People from British Hong Kong
British Army personnel of World War II
Long Range Desert Group personnel
Military personnel from London